Hamoud Muhammed Ou'bad (also Hamoud Mohammed Abad) was appointed Yemen's Minister of Religious Endowments and Guidance on 14 March 2011 after serving as Yemeni Minister of Youth and Sport where he was superseded by Aref Awad Azwka (Aref Awad Azwka).

See also 
Cabinet of Yemen

References

Living people
Year of birth missing (living people)
Sports ministers of Yemen
Religious affairs ministers of Yemen
21st-century Yemeni politicians

Youth and Sports ministers of Yemen
People from Dhamar Governorate